Henriette Hubregtse-Lanzing (1879-1959) was a Dutch artist.

Biography 
Hubregtse-Lanzing née Hubregtse was born on 18 July 1879 in Maastricht. She studied at the Rijksnormaalschool voor Teekenonderwijzers (National Normal School for Drawing Teachers) in Amsterdam and the School voor Kunstnijverheid (Haarlem) (School of Arts and Crafts) in Haarlem. Her work was included in the 1939 exhibition and sale Onze Kunst van Heden (Our Art of Today) at the Rijksmuseum in Amsterdam.

Hubregtse-Lanzing was married twice, in 1904 to A.M. Hubregtse (1880-1925), then in 1927 to Th.E. van Putten (1872-1950). She died  on 28 February 1959 in The Hague.

References

1879 births
1959 deaths
Artists from Maastricht
20th-century Dutch women artists